Thalmann is a ghost town in Glynn County, Georgia.

History 
Thalmann has been settled since the 18th century. Throughout its history, Thalmann has been an important travel route location, serving as a route for soldiers during the American Revolutionary War and later as an early mail system route, then a stagecoach route.

Decline 
In the 1970s, Thalmann was a vacation destination, known for its wildlife. In 1979, a railroad station in the town was rerouted to nearby Jesup, drawing tourist traffic away from the town. By 2001, Thalmann has a population of only approximately 50 residents.

See also 

 List of ghost towns in Georgia

References 

Populated places in Glynn County, Georgia
Ghost towns in Georgia (U.S. state)